Daniele Bracciali and Simone Vagnozzi were the defending champions but decided Bracciali not to participate.
Marcel Felder and Antonio Veić won the title, defeating Daniel Gimeno-Traver and Iván Navarro in the final 5–7, 7–6(7–5), [10–6].

Seeds

Draw

Draw

References
 Main Draw

Citta di Caltanissetta - Doubles
2012 Doubles